This is a list of television programs formerly and currently broadcast by the Canadian television channel MTV2 (Canada) and its former incarnations as Razer and MTV Canada.

Programming
This a list of programs currently being broadcast regularly, as of September 2015.

Current

A-E
1 Girl 5 Gays
California Dreams
Campus PD
Comedy Now!
Disaster Date
The Ex And The Why?
Ex on the Beach

F-O
Friendzone
Geordie Shore
Girl, Get Your Mind Right
Hollywood Heights
The Hook Up
MTV Creeps
MTV Cribs

P-T
Panic Button
Sleeping with the Family
True Life

U-Z
The Valleys

As Razer

Final Programming

0-9
 969 - formally called MTV Select
4REAL

A-E
Alternate Routes
America's Dumbest Criminals
America's Next Top Model
The Andy Dick Show
The Andy Milonakis Show
The Ashlee Simpson Show
Basilisk
Battle for Ozzfest
Beavis and Butt-head
Becoming
Beyond the Break
Boiling Points
Born to Be
Breaker High
Buffy the Vampire Slayer
Call to Greatness
Canada's Next Top Model
Car Cruzin
Celebrity Deathmatch
Clone High
Clueless
Corner Gas
Cops, Cars & Superstars
Cowboy Bebop
Crank Yankers
Daria
Dawson's Creek
Degrassi Junior High
Degrassi: The Next Generation
Diary
Dismissed
Drop the Beat
Drop In
Duckman
Electric Playground
Extreme 16mm
Eye on Extreme

F-J
Fandemonium
Fist of Zen
FNMTV
Fraternity Life
Freshman on Campus
Fromage
Fur TV
Fusion 2001
Fusion TV
Geek to Freak
Girls Behaving Badly
Greg the Bunny
Happy Tree Friends
Hardcore Candy
Headbangers Ball
High School Project USA
The Hilarious House of Frightenstein
Homewrecker
Human Giant
I Bet You Will
Instant Star
Jack Osbourne: Adrenaline Junkie
Jack Osbourne: No Fear

K-O
The Kids in the Hall
Kontrol
Laguna Beach: The Real Orange County
Made
Madison
Making The Video
Malcolm in the Middle
Master of Champions
Meet the Barkers
MTV e2
MTV2 Game Trailers
MTV Live
MTV Screen
MTV Unplugged
MTV2 Videos
MTV Wannabe
Much 911
MuchAdrenaline
Music Is My Life
My Super Sweet 16
Newlyweds: Nick and Jessica
The Osbournes
Odd Job Jack

P-T
Parental Control
Pee-Wee's Playhouse
Pepsi Breakout
Pimp My Ride
Punk’d
Pushing the Limit
The Real World
Reviews on the Run
Ride Guide
Ride with Funkmaster Flex
Road Rules
Rob Dyrdek's Fantasy Factory
Room 401
Room Raiders
Roswell
Sabrina, the Teenage Witch
Samurai 7
Samurai Champloo
Saved by the Bell
Scare Tactics
Scarred
The Score
Screwed Over
The Second Half
Señor Moby's House of Music
Sic 'Em Saturdays Bites
Shin Chan
Silent Library
Snoop Doggy Fizzle Televizzle
Sorority Life
Spy Groove
SpongeBob SquarePants
Straight Up
Student Bodies
Subterranean
Sucker Free
Taildaters
The Tom Green Show
Total Request Live
Trinity Blood
Trippin'
True Life

U-Z
Ultrasound
Under Attack
Vans Triple Crown
Versus
Viva La Bam
The Wade Robson Project
Wanna Come In?
Whacked Out Sports
Whistler
Who's Got Game
Wild 'N Out
Wildboyz
Wonder Showzen
World Famous for Dicking Around
World of Stupid
World's Most Amazing Videos
Wrestling Society X
The Wrong Coast
Yo Momma
Yo! MTV Raps

Kamikaze
Kamikaze was the branding and programming block for anime programming on Razer. It was launched July 2006 and discontinued after the channel's rebrand as MTV2. Similar Canadian programming blocks include YTV's Bionix and G4's Anime Current.

Shows 
Air Master (unaired)
Basilisk
Cowboy Bebop
Neon Genesis Evangelion
Samurai 7
Samurai Champloo
Slam Dunk (unaired)
Shin Chan
The Super Milk Chan Show
Trinity Blood
Wolf's Rain

References

External links
 Official MTV2 website

MTV2
Anime television